Love Rocks is a two-disc compilation album released February 8, 2005, by the Human Rights Campaign in collaboration with Centaur Entertainment. This is HRC's second compilation album, following the release of Being Out Rocks (2002).

Track listing
Disc 1
Christina Aguilera – "Beautiful" (4:01)
Pink – "Love Song" (2:30)
Simply Red – "You Make Me Feel Brand New" (5:05)
Dixie Chicks – "I Believe in Love" (4:13)
Nada Surf – "Inside of Love" (5:01)
Dido – "Thank You" (3:40)
Jen Foster – "SHE" (4:08)
The Bootlickers – "Love Comes Back" (3:27)
L.P. – "Wasted" (4:12)
Sophie B. Hawkins – "Walking on Thin Ice" (4:04)
Keaton Simons – "Currently" (3:08)
Rachael Yamagata – "Be Be Your Love" (4:12)
Matt Alber – "Walk With Me" (4:21)
Kinnie Starr – "Alright" (4:13)
Eric Himan – "No Urgency" (5:13)
Carole King – "An Uncommon Love" (3:31)

Disc 2
Mandy Moore – "I Feel The Earth Move" (3:07)
Melissa Etheridge – "Giant" (5:15)
The B-52's – "Summer of Love" (4:33)
Cyndi Lauper – "Time After Time" (3:59)
Kimberley Locke – "8th World Wonder" (3:32)
Yoko Ono – "Every Man Has a Man ..." (5:04)
BT – "Simply Being Loved" (4:22)
Dave Koz – "Just to Be Next to You" (4:44)
Dolly Parton – "Sugar Hill" (2:50)
Emmylou Harris – "Jupiter's Rising" (3:02)
Garrin Benfield – "Light the Way" (3:43)
Ari Gold – "Home" (4:32)
Jason & deMarco – "All I Long For" (3:41)
Randi Driscoll – "Amazing Grace/What Matters" (6:18)
Billy Porter – "Only One Road" (4:43)
Oleta Adams – "Window of Hope" (4:18)

2005 compilation albums